Verges is a Spanish municipality in the Province of Girona, Catalonia.

Features
The town is famous for its Dansa de la Mort celebrations every Holy Thursday, probably the last remaining Dance of Death in Europe, performed uninterruptedly since the Middle Ages.

Among the notable citizens born in Verges are:
Francesc Cambó. (1876-1947) politician
Lluís Llach. (1948) singer
Maria Perpinyà Sais. (1901-1994) writer and journalist

See also
Traditions of Catalonia

References

External links
Pàgina web de l'Ajuntament
 Government data pages 

Municipalities in Baix Empordà
Populated places in Baix Empordà